is a passenger railway station located in the city of Hannan, Osaka Prefecture, Japan, operated by the private railway operator Nankai Electric Railway. It has the station number "NK38".

Lines

Layout
The station has two opposed side platforms connected by a level crossing. The station is unattended.

Platforms

Adjacent stations

History
Tottorinoshō Station opened on 1 March 1919.

Passenger statistics
In fiscal 2019, the station was used by an average of 3435 passengers daily.

Surrounding area
Hannan Nishitottori Post Office

See also
 List of railway stations in Japan

References

External links

  

Railway stations in Japan opened in 1919
Railway stations in Osaka Prefecture
Hannan, Osaka